Milton Stapp (July 14, 1792 – August 2, 1869) was an American politician who served as the fifth Lieutenant Governor of Indiana from 1828 to 1831.

Stapp was born in Kentucky. Settling in Madison, Indiana, Stapp worked as a shopkeeper. He served in the War of 1812 and attained the rank of general. He was elected to the Indiana Senate and became president pro tempore of the state senate in 1825. From 1828 to 1831, he served as Lieutenant Governor under James B. Ray. He later became a member of the Whig Party. He succeeded Moody Park to become the second mayor of Madison, serving from 1850-53. As Mayor, he was known to arrest citizens on the streets unaided. In 1853, he bought a Madison newspaper, the Banner. He also served as the state Canal Commissioner and the state Late Fund Commissioner.

References

1792 births
1869 deaths
Lieutenant Governors of Indiana
People from Madison, Indiana
People from Indiana in the War of 1812
Indiana state senators